John S. Bilby (January 10, 1832 – November 26, 1919) was founder of the Bilby Ranch, which claimed to be the second largest ranch in the United States in the late 19th and early 20th centuries.

The ranch headquartered in Quitman, Missouri, had holdings throughout the U.S. Southwest. Bilby settled in Nodaway County, Missouri, in 1868 and began expanding his empire using one property as collateral for the next. Soon it stretched from Missouri to Oklahoma to Texas to New Mexico. A dispute over the cattle operations was addressed by the United States Supreme Court in 1887 in the case of Teal v. Bilby.  At its peak the ranch reported to be 200,000 acres.

However, since the ranch was totally based on borrowed funds it eventually collapsed, and Bilby was left with the only unmortgaged property—the home in Quitman. He died after being hit by a train shortly after the collapse of the ranch.

Portions of ranch became the O Bar O Ranch in Texas and joined King Ranch, which was the biggest ranch.

The State of Missouri acquired  of the land around Quitman in 1989 to form the Bilby Ranch Conservation Area.

References

External links
Missouri Conservationist Bilby profile

1832 births
1919 deaths
People from Nodaway County, Missouri
Ranchers from Missouri
Railway accident deaths in the United States